Michele Messina (born 9 March 1996) is an Italian football player. He plays as a defender.

Club career

Atalanta

Loan to Parma 
On 1 August 2015, Messina was loaned to Serie D side Parma on a 2-season loan deal. On 13 September he made his Serie D debut for Parma as a substitute replacing Lorenzo Adorni in the 84th minute of a 2–1 home win over Villafranca Veronese. On 16 September he played his first entire match for Parma, a 5–0 away win over Fortis Juventus. On 6 December he scored his first goal for Parma in the 11th minute of a 3–2 home win over Ravenna. On 28 February 2016, Messina scored his second goal in the 74th minute of a 1–0 home win over Lentigione Calcio. On 22 May he was sent off with a double yellow card in the 90th minute of a 2–2 home draw against Sambenedettese. Messina ended his first season at Parma with 25 appearances, 2 goals and 2 assists, and with the promotion in Serie C.

On 3 September he made his professional debut in Serie C for Parma as a substitute replacing Desiderio Garufo in the 60th minute of a 1–0 home win over Lumezzane. On 10 September he played hs first entire match for Parma in Serie C, a 0–0 away draw against Santarcangelo. Messina ended his second season at Parma with only 8 appearances, only 1 as a starter and the promotion in Serie B after the play-off, in total he made 33 appearances, 2 goals and 2 assists.

Loan to Pro Piacenza 
On 20 July 2017, Messina was signed by Serie C side Pro Piacenza on aseason-long loan deal. On 30 July he made his debut for Pro Picenza in a 4–1 away defeat against Vicenza in the first round of Coppa Italia, he played the entire match. On 3 September he made his Serie C debut for Pro Piacenza as a substitute replacing Matteo Abbate in the 74th minute of a 1–0 away defeat against Carrarese. On 10 September he played his first entire match for Pro Piacenza in Serie C, a 1–1 home draw against Alessandria. Messina ended his season-long loan to Pro Piacenza with 21 appearances, 11 as a starter and 1 assist.

Viterbese Castrense 
On 7 July 2018, Messina joined to Serie C club Viterbese Castrense on an undisclosed fee and with a 2-year contract. On 29 July he made his debut for Viterbese Castrense as a substitute replacing Diego Cenciarelli in the 85th minute of a 1–0 home draw against Rende in the first round of Coppa Italia. On 6 November he made his league debut for the club as a substitute replacing Francesco De Giorgi in the 74th minute of a 2–1 home defeat against Sicula Leonzio. In the first half of the season he made only 6 appearances, all as a substitute and he stayed an unused substitute 9 times.

Loan to Triestina
On 30 January 2019, Messina joined Triestina on loan with a purchase option. On 5 May he made his debut for the club in a 1–0 away defeat against Fano, he was replaced by Andrea Marzola after 82 minutes. This was also his only appearances that he made for Triestina.

Rimini 
On 2 September 2019 he moved to Serie C club Rimini.

Career statistics

Club

References

External links
 

1996 births
Living people
People from Vimercate
Italian footballers
Parma Calcio 1913 players
U.S. Triestina Calcio 1918 players
Rimini F.C. 1912 players
Serie C players
Serie D players
Association football defenders
Footballers from Lombardy
Sportspeople from the Province of Monza e Brianza